"Baby Tonight" is a single written, produced and sung by Marlon Jackson from his solo debut album, Baby Tonight. The song was released as the album's lead single on June 30, 1987 by Capitol Records. It reached No. 57 on the Hot R&B Singles chart in the United States. It is also one of two singles from the album.

Charts

References

1987 singles
Marlon Jackson songs
Capitol Records singles
1987 songs